Painful Maturity is 1980 South Korean melodrama film directed by Park Chul-soo.

Plot
Su-jin, a girl prone to lapses into unconsciousness, is saved by Kyung-ho when she passes out on the street. After Kyung-ho leaves her in a hospital, he leaves on a three-month voyage. Hoping to meet him on his return, Su-jin goes to see his ship on its scheduled arrival. She passes out, and Kyung-ho is not on the ship. Jang-won, a medical student, falls in love with Su-jin during her recuperation, but must give her up when Kyung-ho returns.

Cast
Yun Sang-mi 
Yu In-chon 
Yoon Il-bong 
Jung Hye-sun 
No Jin-a 
Kim Yeon-hui 
Son Jeon
Kim Sin-myeong

References

External links
 
 
 
 

South Korean romantic drama films
1980 films
1980 romantic drama films
Films directed by Park Chul-soo